Elvaston is a civil parish in the South Derbyshire district of Derbyshire, England. The parish contains 28 listed buildings that are recorded in the National Heritage List for England. Of these, one is listed at Grade I, the highest of the three grades, one is at Grade II*, the middle grade, and the others are at Grade II, the lowest grade.  The parish contains the village of Elvaston and the surrounding area, including the country house Elvaston Castle, which is listed, together with associated structures and buildings in its grounds.  The other listed buildings are houses and cottages, a church and associated structures, two mileposts, a former school and schoolmaster's house, and a war memorial.


Key

Buildings

References

Citations

Sources

 

Lists of listed buildings in Derbyshire